Wind power generates a very small part (1.26 billion kWh) of Armenia's electricity annually, as less than 10 MW is installed.

According to a study sponsored by the United States Department of Energy (DOE) and the United States Agency for International Development (USAID) in 2002–2003, the theoretical wind power potential of Armenia is 4,900 MWe in four zones with a total area of 979 km2. According to this research, the wind energy potential in Armenia is close to 450 MW. The most promising areas for wind power plants are Zod pass, Bazum Mountain, Jajur pass, the territory of Geghama Mountains, Sevan Pass, Aparan, the highlands between Sisian and Goris, and the region of Meghri.

However a reassessment by the Asian Development Bank is expected to be completed by 2025.

Wind farms

Future plans and investments 
Monitoring in Qarahach pass was conducted by the Armenian-Italian private company “Ar Energy.” The company has a license to construct the “Qarahach 1” wind farm with an overall capacity of 20 MW, which could be expanded to 140 MW in the future.

References